Pat Burnet (born 25 July 1939) is a former Scotland international rugby union player who played as a Centre.

Rugby Union career

Amateur career

He played for Edinburgh Academicals.

He went to Lincoln College, Oxford, and then played rugby union for Oxford University.

Provincial career

Burnet was capped by Edinburgh District. His first Edinburgh cap came against Northumberland in 1961. 

He played for Blues Trial against Whites Trial in December 1963.

International career

Burnet was capped by Scotland just the once, in 1960, to play against South Africa.

References

1939 births
Edinburgh Academicals rugby union players
Edinburgh District (rugby union) players
Scotland international rugby union players
Scottish rugby union players
Rugby union players from Edinburgh
Rugby union centres
Blues Trial players
Oxford University RFC players
Alumni of Lincoln College, Oxford